2006 Polonskaya is a stony Flora asteroid and asynchronous binary system from the inner regions of the asteroid belt, approximately  in diameter. It was discovered on 22 September 1973, by Soviet astronomer Nikolai Chernykh at the Crimean Astrophysical Observatory in Nauchnij, on the Crimean peninsula, and later named after Ukrainian astronomer Elena Kazimirtchak-Polonskaïa. Its one-kilometer-sized satellite was discovered by an international collaboration of astronomers in November 2005.

Classification and orbit 

Polonskaya is a member of the Flora family, one of the largest collisional populations of stony asteroids, when applying the synthetic hierarchical clustering method (HCM) by Nesvorný. However, according to another HCM-analysis by Milani and Knežević (AstDys), it is a background asteroid as in this analysis the Flora asteroid clan is not recognized. Polonskaya orbits the Sun in the inner main-belt at a distance of 1.9–2.8 AU once every 3 years and 7 months (1,295 days; semi-major axis of 2.32 AU). Its orbit has an eccentricity of 0.19 and an inclination of 5° with respect to the ecliptic. On 16 September 1941, it was first observed at the Finnish Turku Observatory in Finland. The body's observation arc begins in April 1950 at Palomar Mountain, about 23 years prior to its official discovery observation.

Naming 

This minor planet was named after Russian astronomer Elena Ivanovna Kazimirchak-Polonskaya (1902–1992), who researched the motion and orbital evolution of comets, in particular the capture of comets by major planets. She was a member of IAU's Commission XX, and was awarded the F. A. Bredikhin prize. The official  was published by the Minor Planet Center on 1 September 1978.

Satellite 

In 2005, it was claimed that lightcurve observations indicate that Polonskaya has a small moon about 0.99 km in diameter. However, the non-synchronously rotating binary still needs to be fully resolved in order to confirm such satellite. Alternatively, the presence of another body has also been suggested to explain the lightcurve's irregular period, which would make it a trinary asteroid.

Physical characteristics 

Polonskaya is considered a stony S-type asteroid with a typically high albedo due to its membership to the Flora family.

Lightcurves 

Between 2005 and 2010, several rotational lightcurves of Polonskaya were obtained from photometric observations by Donald Pray, Petr Pravec, Peter Kušnirák, Walter Cooney, John  Gross and Dirk Terrell. Lightcurve analysis gave a rotation period between 3.114 and 3.1183 hours with a brightness amplitude of 0.18–0.10 magnitude for the best rated results.

Diameter and albedo 

According to the survey carried out by NASA's Wide-field Infrared Survey Explorer with its subsequent NEOWISE mission, Polonskaya measures 4.625 kilometers in diameter and its surface has an albedo of 0.354. The Collaborative Asteroid Lightcurve Link adopts Petr Pravec's revised WISE-data, that is, an albedo of 0.3498 and a diameter of 4.80 kilometers based on an absolute magnitude of 13.35.

References

External links 
 Asteroids with Satellites, Robert Johnston, johnstonsarchive.net
 Asteroid Lightcurve Database (LCDB), query form (info )
 Dictionary of Minor Planet Names, Google books
 Asteroids and comets rotation curves, CdR – Geneva Observatory, Raoul Behrend
 Discovery Circumstances: Numbered Minor Planets (1)-(5000) – Minor Planet Center
 
 

002006
Discoveries by Nikolai Chernykh
Named minor planets
002006
19730922
20051101